Ki. Va. Jagannathan (11 April 1906 – 4 November 1988), popularly known by his initials as Ki. Va. Ja, was a Tamil scholar, commentator, journalist, poet, writer and folklorist from Tamil Nadu, India. He was a student of noted Tamil scholar and publisher U. V. Swaminatha Iyer. He was the editor of the magazine Kalaimagal.  He won the Sahitya Akademi award in 1967 in Tamil language category for his literary criticism Virar Ulagam.
He has written extensive commentaries on many Tamil devotional texts including Kandar Alangaram, Kandar Anubhuthi, Thirumurugattruppadai, Abirami Andathi and Kandar Kalivenba.He has written more than 200 books on various topics in Tamil literature and grammar.
He was a great orator and was popularly known as Vageesa Kalanidhi, a title bestowed on him by Kanchi Paramacharya.

References

Further reading
Ki. Va. Jagannathan profile in Dina Mani

1906 births
1988 deaths
20th-century Indian journalists
Recipients of the Sahitya Akademi Award in Tamil
Tamil writers
Journalists from Tamil Nadu
People from Karur district
Indian editors
Indian Tamil people